Multiple sclerosis can cause a variety of symptoms: changes in sensation (hypoesthesia), muscle weakness, abnormal muscle spasms, or difficulty moving; difficulties with coordination and balance; problems in speech (dysarthria) or swallowing (dysphagia), visual problems (nystagmus, optic neuritis, phosphenes or diplopia), fatigue and acute or chronic pain syndromes, bladder and bowel difficulties, cognitive impairment, or emotional symptomatology (mainly major depression). The main clinical measure in progression of the disability and severity of the symptoms is the Expanded Disability Status Scale or EDSS.

The initial attacks are often transient, mild (or asymptomatic), and self-limited. They often do not prompt a health care visit and sometimes are only identified in retrospect once the diagnosis has been made after further attacks. The most common initial symptoms reported are: changes in sensation in the arms, legs or face (33%), complete or partial vision loss (optic neuritis) (20%), weakness (13%), double vision (7%), unsteadiness when walking (5%), and balance problems (3%); but many rare initial symptoms have been reported such as aphasia or psychosis. Fifteen percent of individuals have multiple symptoms when they first seek medical attention.

Bladder and bowel
Bladder problems (See also urinary system and urination) appear in 70–80% of people with multiple sclerosis (MS) and they have an important effect both on hygiene habits and social activity.
Bladder problems are usually related with high levels of disability and pyramidal signs in lower limbs.

The most common problems are an increase in frequency and urgency (incontinence) but difficulties to begin urination, hesitation, leaking, sensation of incomplete urination, and retention also appear. When retention occurs secondary urinary infections are common.

There are many cortical and subcortical structures implicated in urination and MS lesions in various central nervous system structures can cause these kinds of symptoms.

Treatment objectives are the alleviation of symptoms of urinary dysfunction, treatment of urinary infections, reduction of complicating factors and the preservation of renal function. Treatments can be classified in two main subtypes: pharmacological and non-pharmacological.
Pharmacological treatments vary greatly depending on the origin or type of dysfunction and some examples of the medications used are:
alfuzosin for retention,
trospium and flavoxate for urgency and incontinency,
and desmopressin for nocturia.
Non pharmacological treatments involve the use of pelvic floor muscle training, stimulation, biofeedback, pessaries, bladder retraining, and sometimes intermittent catheterization.

Bowel problems affect around 70% of patients. Around 50% of patients experience constipation and up to 30% experience fecal incontinence. Cause of bowel impairments in MS patients is usually either a reduced gut motility or an impairment in neurological control of defecation. The former is commonly related to immobility or secondary effects from drugs used in the treatment of the disease. Pain or problems with defecation can be helped with a diet change which includes among other changes an increased fluid intake, oral laxatives or suppositories and enemas when habit changes and oral measures are not enough to control the problems.

Cognitive

Some of the most common deficits affect recent memory, attention, processing speed, visual-spatial abilities and executive function. Symptoms related to cognition include emotional instability and fatigue including neurological fatigue. Commonly a form of cognitive disarray is experienced, where specific cognitive processes may remain unaffected, but cognitive processes as a whole are impaired. Cognitive deficits are independent of physical disability and can occur in the absence of neurological dysfunction. Severe impairment is a major predictor of a low quality of life, unemployment, caregiver distress, and difficulty in driving; limitations in a patient's social and work activities are also correlated with the extent of impairment.

Cognitive impairments occur in about 40 to 60 percent of patients with multiple sclerosis, with the lowest percentages usually from community-based studies and the highest ones from hospital-based. Impairments may be present at the beginning of the disease. Probable multiple sclerosis patients, meaning after a first attack but before a secondary confirmatory one, have up to 50 percent of patients with impairment at onset. Dementia is rare and occurs in only five percent of patients.

Measures of tissue atrophy are well correlated with, and predict, cognitive dysfunction. Neuropsychological outcomes are highly correlated with linear measures of sub-cortical atrophy. Cognitive impairment is the result of not only tissue damage, but tissue repair and adaptive functional reorganization. Neuropsychological testing is important for determining the extent of cognitive deficits. Neuropsychological rehabilitation may help to reverse or decrease the cognitive deficits although studies on the issue have been of low quality. Acetylcholinesterase inhibitors are commonly used to treat Alzheimer's disease related dementia and so are thought to have potential in treating the cognitive deficits in multiple sclerosis. They have been found to be effective in preliminary clinical trials.

Emotional
Emotional symptoms are also common and are thought to be both a normal response to having a debilitating disease and the result of damage to specific areas of the central nervous system that generate and control emotions.

Clinical depression is the most common neuropsychiatric condition: lifetime depression prevalence rates of 40–50% and 12-month prevalence rates around 20% have been typically reported for samples of people with MS; these figures are considerably higher than those for the general population or for people with other chronic illnesses. Brain imaging studies trying to relate depression to lesions in certain regions of the brain have met with variable success. On balance the evidence seems to favour an association with neuropathology in the left anterior temporal/parietal regions.

Other feelings such as anger, anxiety, frustration, and hopelessness also appear frequently. Suicide is a possibility, since it accounts for 15% of MS deaths.

Rarely psychosis may also be featured.

Fatigue
Fatigue is very common and disabling in MS with a close relationship to depressive symptomatology. When depression is reduced fatigue also tends to reduce and it is recommended that patients should be evaluated for depression before other therapeutic approaches are used. In a similar way other factors such as disturbed sleep, chronic pain, poor nutrition, or even some medications can all contribute to fatigue and medical professionals are encouraged to identify and modify them. There are also different medications used to treat fatigue; such as amantadine, or pemoline; as well as psychological interventions of energy conservation; but their effects are small and for these reasons fatigue is a difficult symptom to manage. Fatigue has also been related to specific brain areas in MS using magnetic resonance imaging.

Internuclear ophthalmoplegia

Internuclear ophthalmoplegia is a disorder of conjugate lateral gaze. The affected eye shows impairment of adduction. The partner eye diverges from the affected eye during abduction, producing diplopia; during extreme abduction, compensatory nystagmus can be seen in the partner eye. Diplopia means double vision while nystagmus is involuntary eye movement characterized by alternating smooth pursuit in one direction and a saccadic movement in the other direction.

Internuclear ophthalmoplegia occurs when MS affects a part of the brain stem called the medial longitudinal fasciculus, which is responsible for communication between the two eyes by connecting the abducens nucleus of one side to the oculomotor nucleus of the opposite side. This results in the failure of the medial rectus muscle to contract appropriately, so that the eyes do not move equally (called disconjugate gaze).

Different drugs as well as optic compensatory systems and prisms can be used to improve these symptoms.
Surgery can also be used in some cases for this problem.

Mobility restrictions

Restrictions in mobility (walking, transfers, bed mobility etc.) are common in individuals with multiple sclerosis. Although this is not something constant it can happen when experiencing a flare up. Within 10 years after the onset of MS one-third of patients reach a score of 6 on the Expanded Disability Status Scale (EDSS), requiring the use of a unilateral walking aid, and by 30 years the proportion increases to 83%. Within five years of onset the EDSS is six in 50% of those with the progressive form of MS.

A wide range of impairments may exist in people with MS, which can act either alone or in combination to impact directly on a person's balance, function and mobility. Such impairments include fatigue, weakness, hypertonicity, low exercise tolerance, impaired balance, ataxia and tremor.

Interventions may be aimed at the individual impairments that reduce mobility or at the level of disability. This second level intervention includes provision, education, and instruction in the use of equipment such as walking aids, wheelchairs, motorized scooters and car adaptations as well as instruction on compensatory strategies to accomplish an activity — for example undertaking safe transfers by pivoting in a flexed posture rather than standing up and stepping around.

Optic neuritis

Up to 50% of patients with MS will develop an episode of optic neuritis and 20% of the time optic neuritis is the presenting sign of MS. The presence of demyelinating white matter lesions on brain MRIs at the time of presentation for optic neuritis is the strongest predictor in developing clinical diagnosis of MS. Almost half of patients with optic neuritis have white matter lesions consistent with multiple sclerosis.

At five year follow-ups the overall risk of developing MS is 30%, with or without MRI lesions. Patients with a normal MRI still develop MS (16%), but at a lower rate compared to those patients with three or more MRI lesions (51%). From the other perspective, however, 44% of patients with any demyelinating lesions on MRI at presentation will not have developed MS ten years later.

Individuals experience rapid onset of pain in one eye followed by blurry vision in part or all its visual field. Flashes of light (phosphenes) may also be present. Inflammation of the optic nerve causes loss of vision most usually by the swelling and destruction of the myelin sheath covering the optic nerve.

The blurred vision usually resolves within 10 weeks but individuals are often left with less vivid color vision, especially red, in the affected eye.

A systemic intravenous treatment with corticosteroids may quicken the healing of the optic nerve, prevent complete loss of vision and delay the onset of other symptoms.

Pain
Pain is a common symptom in MS. A recent study systematically pooling results from 28 studies (7101 patients) estimates that pain affects 63% of people with MS. These 28 studies described pain in a large range of different people with MS. The authors found no evidence that pain was more common in people with progressive types of MS, in females compared to males, in people with different levels of disability, or in people who had had MS for different periods of time.

Pain can be severe and debilitating, and can have a profound effect on the quality of life and mental health of those affected.
Certain types of pain are thought to sometimes appear after a lesion to the ascending or descending tracts that control the transmission of painful stimulus, such as the anterolateral system, but many other causes are also possible.
The most prevalent types of pain are thought to be headaches (43%), dysesthetic limb pain (26%), back pain (20%), painful spasms (15%), painful Lhermitte's phenomenon (16%) and Trigeminal Neuralgia (3%). These authors did not however find enough data to quantify the prevalence of painful optic neuritis.

Acute pain is mainly due to optic neuritis, trigeminal neuralgia, Lhermitte's sign or dysesthesias. Subacute pain is usually secondary to the disease and can be a consequence of spending too much time in the same position, urinary retention, or infected skin ulcers. Chronic pain is common and harder to treat.

Trigeminal neuralgia
Trigeminal neuralgia (or "tic douloureux") is a disorder of the trigeminal nerve that causes episodes of intense pain in the eyes, lips, nose, scalp, forehead, and jaw, affecting 2-4% of MS patients. The episodes of pain occur paroxysmally (suddenly) and the patients describe it as trigger area on the face, so sensitive that touching or even air currents can bring an episode of pain. Usually it is successfully treated with anticonvulsants such as
carbamazepine,
or phenytoin
although others such as gabapentin can be used.
When drugs are not effective, surgery may be recommended. Glycerol rhizotomy (surgical injection of glycerol into a nerve) has been studied
although the beneficial effects and risks in MS patients of the procedures that relieve pressure on the nerve are still under discussion.

Lhermitte's sign
Lhermitte's sign is an electrical sensation that runs down the back and into the limbs and is produced by bending the neck forward. The sign suggests a lesion of the dorsal columns of the cervical cord or of the caudal medulla, correlating significantly with cervical MRI abnormalities.
Between 25 and 40% of MS patients report having Lhermitte's sign during the course of their illness. It is not always experienced as painful, but about 16% of people with MS will experience painful Lhermitte's sign.

Dysesthesias
Dysesthesias are disagreeable sensations produced by ordinary stimuli. The abnormal sensations are caused by lesions of the peripheral or central sensory pathways, and are described as painful feelings such as burning, wetness, itching, electric shock or pins and needles. Both Lhermitte's sign and painful dysesthesias usually respond well to treatment with carbamazepine, clonazepam or amitriptyline. A related symptom is a pleasant, yet unsettling sensation which has no normal explanation (such as sensation of gentle warmth arising from touch by clothing)

Reduced sense of smell
People with Multiple Sclerosis have been found to have reduced sense of smell, including lower olfactory thresholds.

Sexual
Sexual dysfunction (SD) is one of many symptoms affecting persons with a diagnosis of MS. SD in men encompasses both erectile and ejaculatory disorder. The prevalence of SD in men with MS ranges from 75 to 91%. Erectile dysfunction appears to be the most common form of SD documented in MS. SD may be due to alteration of the ejaculatory reflex which can be affected by neurological conditions such as MS. Sexual dysfunction is also prevalent in female MS patients, typically lack of orgasm, probably related to disordered genital sensation.

Spasticity

Spasticity is characterized by increased stiffness and slowness in limb movement, the development of certain postures, an association with weakness of voluntary muscle power, and with involuntary and sometimes painful spasms of limbs. Painful spasms affect about 15% of people with MS overall. A physiotherapist can help to reduce spasticity and avoid the development of contractures with techniques such as passive stretching. There is evidence, albeit limited, of the clinical effectiveness of THC and CBD extracts, baclofen, dantrolene, diazepam, and tizanidine. In the most complicated cases intrathecal injections of baclofen can be used. There are also palliative measures like castings, splints or customized seating's.

Speech and swallowing
Speech problems include slurred speech, low tone of voice (dysphonia), decreased talking speed, and problems with articulation of sounds (dysarthria).

A related problem, since it involves similar anatomical structures, is swallowing difficulties (dysphagia).

Transverse myelitis

Some MS patients develop rapid onset of numbness, weakness, bowel or bladder dysfunction, and/or loss of muscle function, typically in the lower half of the body. This is the result of MS attacking the spinal cord. The symptoms and signs depend upon the nerve cords involved and the extent of the involvement.

Prognosis for complete recovery is generally poor. Recovery from transverse myelitis usually begins between weeks 2 and 12 following onset and may continue for up to 2 years in some patients and as many as 80% of individuals with transverse myelitis are left with lasting disabilities.

Though it was considered for many years that traverse myelitis was a normal consequence of MS, since the discovery of anti-AQP4 and anti-MOG biomarkers it is not. Now TM is considered an indicator of neuromyelitis optica, and a red flag against the diagnosis of MS.

Tremor and ataxia
 

Tremor is an unintentional, somewhat rhythmic, muscle movement involving to-and-fro movements (oscillations) of one or more parts of the body. It is the most common of all involuntary movements and can affect the hands, arms, head, face, vocal cords, trunk, and legs.
Ataxia is an unsteady and clumsy motion of the limbs or torso due to a failure of the gross coordination of muscle movements. People with ataxia experience a failure of muscle control in their arms and legs, resulting in a lack of balance and coordination or a disturbance of gait.

Tremor and ataxia are frequent in MS and present in 25 to 60% of patients. They can be very disabling and embarrassing, and are difficult to manage. The origin of tremor in MS is difficult to identify but it can be due to a mixture of different factors such as damage to the cerebellar connections, weakness, spasticity, etc.

Many medications have been proposed to treat tremor; however their efficacy is very limited. Medications that have been reported to provide some relief are isoniazid, carbamazepine, propranolol
and gluthetimide but published evidence of effectiveness is limited. Physical therapy is not indicated as a treatment for tremor or ataxia although the use of orthese devices can help. An example is the use of wrist bandages with weights, which can be useful to increase the inertia of movement and therefore reduce tremor. Daily use objects are also adapted so they are easier to grab and use.

If all these measures fail patients are candidates for thalamus surgery. This kind of surgery can be both a thalamotomy or the implantation of a thalamic stimulator. Complications are frequent (30% in thalamotomy and 10% in deep brain stimulation) and include a worsening of ataxia, dysarthria and hemiparesis. Thalamotomy is a more efficacious surgical treatment for intractable MS tremor though the higher incidence of persistent neurological deficits in patients receiving lesional surgery supports the use of deep brain stimulation as the preferred surgical strategy.

References

Autoimmune diseases
Symptoms and signs: Nervous system
Multiple sclerosis